Mark Roberts may refer to:
 Mark Roberts (actor) (1921–2006), American stage, film and television actor
 Mark Roberts (archaeologist) (born 1961), English archaeologist
 Mark Roberts (Australian footballer) (born 1965), Australian rules footballer
 Mark Roberts (businessman), Welsh businessman
 Mark Roberts (footballer, born 1975), Scottish footballer, currently playing for Hurlford United
 Mark Roberts (footballer, born 1983), English footballer
 Mark Roberts (TV producer) (born 1961), American television producer, actor, writer
 Mark Roberts (musician) (born 1967), Welsh singer with Catatonia
 Mark Roberts (streaker) (born 1964), British streaker
 Mark Roberts (rugby league, born 1982), Welsh rugby league player

See also
 Marc Roberts (disambiguation)
 Mark Robertson (disambiguation)